Apocalypse Now is Pere Ubu's third live album, and their first to document a single performance.  The show in question, recorded on December 7, 1991, at Schubas Tavern in Chicago, was performed semi-acoustically, with synth-man Eric Drew Feldman instead handling an upright piano, and Jim Jones playing an amplified (and occasionally heavily distorted) acoustic guitar.

Track listing
"My Theory of Spontaneous Simultude" (Allen Ravenstine, Daved Hild, David Thomas, Garo Yellin, Tony Maimone) – 6:47
"Life of Riley" (Thomas, Eric Drew Feldman, Jim Jones, Scott Krauss, Maimone) – 3:08
"Wine Dark Sparks" (Chris Cutler, Thomas, Feldman, Jones, Krauss, Maimone)  – 3:16
"Heaven" (Ravenstine, Thomas, Krauss, Tom Herman, Maimone) – 3:28
"Worlds in Collision" (Thomas, Feldman, Jones, Krauss, Maimone) – 2:49
"Cry Cry Cry" (Cutler, Thomas, Feldman, Jones, Krauss, Maimone) – 3:10
"Non-Alignment Pact/I Wanna Be Your Dog" (Ravenstine, Thomas, Krauss, Herman, Maimone/David Alexander, Iggy Pop, Ron Asheton, Scott Asheton) – 3:41
"Caligari's Mirror" (Ravenstine, Thomas, Krauss, Herman, Maimone) – 3:33
"Invisible Man" (Cutler, Thomas, Feldman, Jones, Krauss, Maimone) – 3:38
"We Have the Technology" (Ravenstine, Cutler, Thomas, Jones, Krauss, Maimone) – 3:10
"Humor Me" (Ravenstine, Thomas, Krauss, Herman, Maimone) – 4:18
"Busman's Honeymoon" (Ravenstine, Cutler, Thomas, Jones, Krauss, Maimone) – 3:20
"Oh Catherine" (Thomas, Feldman, Jones, Krauss, Maimone) – 4:24
"Misery Goats/Master of the Universe" (Ravenstine, Thomas, Mayo Thompson, Krauss, Maimone/Dave Brock, Nik Turner) – 3:49

Personnel
Pere Ubu
David Thomas - vocals, radio, swirl horn
Jim Jones - acoustic guitar, rat pedal
Eric Drew Feldman - honky-tonk upright piano
Tony Maimone - acoustic guitar, electric bass
Scott Krauss - drums, percussion
Technical
Todd Petersen - engineer
John Thompson - artwork, photography

References

Pere Ubu albums
1999 live albums